Promark is a Houston, Texas-based American drum stick company. Since 2011, it is part of strings company D'Addario. Promark is a widely known stick company generally played in drum set, drum and bugle corps and concert bands.

History
Promark was founded in 1957 by percussion instructor and shop owner Herb Brochstein in Houston, Texas. It was the first company to introduce Japanese Shira-Kashi white oak into the American market, and the only company to successfully market oak sticks in the United States. The wood provided for Promark is supplied by Japanese trader Tatsuo Kosaka. In recent years, Promark has moved to use of non-endangered wood and a "green" finishing process to make their sticks and manufacturing processes safer to the player and the environment.

In 1985, Promark patented a rute for drum kit use, introducing it as the Hot Rod. Several similar models followed, both from them and other manufacturers.

Notable products
Promark offers many signature products from notable players and endorsees, such as System Blues by the Blue Devils for field marching, and the Todd Suchermans (Styx) for stage playing. Other autographed models are by Nick Mason, Dave Lombardo, Phil Collins, Neil Peart, Mike Portnoy, Chris Adler, Marco Minnemann, Jason Bonham, Joey Jordison, Paul Wertico, Bill Bruford, Jason Bittner and Charlie Adams.

References

External links
Official website
Herb Brochstein Interview NAMM Oral History Library (2004)
Maury Brochstein Interview NAMM Oral History Library (2006)

Percussion instrument manufacturing companies
Musical instrument manufacturing companies of the United States
Manufacturing companies based in Houston
Manufacturing companies established in 1957